Nethalp, or Lorediakarkar, is a language of the East Santo languages, a group of languages in the Austronesian family of Languages.  It is spoken by about 340 people out of an ethnic population of 850 on Espiritu Santo Island in Vanuatu. It is close to the Shark Bay language.

References

Moseley, Christopher and R. E. Asher, ed. Atlas of the Worlds Languages. (New York: Routelage, 1994)

}

Languages of Vanuatu
Espiritu Santo languages
Critically endangered languages